Nothing Inside may refer to:

"Nothing Inside", song by Sander van Doorn featuring Mayaeni 2012
"Nothing Inside", song by Singapore Sling (band) 2012
"Nothing Inside", song by Machine Gun Kelly from Tickets to My Downfall 2020